A list of rivers of New Caledonia:

Amoa River
Canala River
Cap River
Comboui River
Diahot River
Dothio River
Dumbéa River 
Hienghène River
Ho River
Houaïlou River
Iouanga River
Karoipa River
Koua River
Kouakoué River
Kouaoua River
Koué River
Koumac River
Kuébéni River
La Coulée River
La Foa River
Moindah River 
Moindou River
Monéo River
Mou River
Nakéty River
Néavin River
Néhoué River
Népoui River
Néra River
Nessadiou River
Ngo River
Ngoye River
Ni River
Nimbaye River
Nimbo (Mba) River
Ouaco River
Ouaième River
Ouango River
Ouaméni River
Oué Bouameu River
Oué Pouanlotch River
Ouenghi River
Ouha River
Ouinné River
Pirogues River
Plum River
Poué Koué River
Pourina River
Poya River
Salée River
Taom River
Tchamba River
Témala River
Thio River
Tiaoué River
Tinip River
Tiwaka River
To N'deu River
Tontouta River
Voh River
Yaté River

References

 
New Caledonia